Domino Tiles is a Unicode block containing characters for representing game situations in dominoes. The block includes symbols for the standard six dot tile set and backs in horizontal and vertical orientations.

History
The following Unicode-related documents record the purpose and process of defining specific characters in the Domino Tiles block:

References 

Unicode blocks
Unicode blocks with characters for games
Dot patterns
Tiles